Mondo Topless is a 1966 pseudo-documentary directed by Russ Meyer, featuring Babette Bardot and Lorna Maitland among others. It was Meyer's first color film following a string of black and white "roughie nudies", including Faster, Pussycat! Kill! Kill! While a straightforward sexploitation film, the film owes some debt to the French New Wave and cinéma vérité traditions, and is known to some under the titles Mondo Girls and Mondo Top. 

Its tagline: "Two Much For One Man...Russ Meyer's Busty Buxotic Beauties ... Titilating ... Torrid ... Untopable ... Too Much For One Man!"

The film was banned in Finland.

Plot 
The film presents a snapshot of '60s San Francisco before shifting its focus to strippers. The strippers' lives are earnestly portrayed as they reveal the day-to-day realities of sex work, talk bra sizes, relate their preferences in men, all voiced over while dancing topless to a '60s instrumental rock soundtrack. Throughout a large portion of the film, the narrator talks about the women as if they are a subgenre of the counter culture movement, somewhat similar to the beatnik or hippie movements that were highly prevalent during the same era. The "Topless" movement as it is called by the narrator could also be perceived as an allegorical subset of the Sexual Revolution of the 1960s.

Cast 
 Babette Bardot as Bouncy
 Pat Barrington as Herself (as Pat Barringer)
 Sin Lenee as Lucious
 Darlene Gray as Buxotic
 Diane Young as Yummy
 Darla Paris as Delicious
 Donna X as Xciting
 Veronique Gabriel as Herself (Europe in the Raw footage)
 Greta Thorwald as Herself (Europe in the Raw footage)
 Denice Duval as Herself (Europe in the Raw footage)
 Abundavita as Herself (Europe in the Raw footage)
 Heide Richter as Herself (Europe in the Raw footage)
 Gigi La Touche as Herself (Europe in the Raw footage)
 Yvette Le Grand as Herself (Europe in the Raw footage)
 Lorna Maitland as Herself (Lorna screentest footage)

Production
Meyer made the film after his "gothic period" - four dramatic movies he did in black and white, starting with Lorna and going through to Faster, Pussycat! Kill! Kill!. It was shot to cash in on the San Francisco "topless boom" of the 1960s.

Documentary traditions 
The title Mondo Topless derives from the series of "mondo" films of the early 1960s. The first and most successful of these was Mondo Cane (A Dog's World). The purpose of these films was to bypass censorship laws by presenting both sexual and graphically violent material in a documentary format.

Mondo Topless shares some stylistic similarities with Jean-Luc Godard's collaborative effort, Le plus vieux métier du monde (The Oldest Trade in the World). Mondo Topless, like most other Meyer films, drew much of its inspiration from the more relaxed European attitudes toward sex, and was followed by a host of imitators.

Reception
Author Jimmy McDonogh later wrote, "How is this movie to be taken? An intense magnification of a completely negative sexual mythology? Or only a frenetic drone, an unrelenting meditation on nothingness best put into words by Pat Barringer, the dancer on the electrical tower: 'All that you're doing is a dance it has no meaning whatsoever...'"

Roger Ebert wrote Mondo Topless "is in some ways quite an interesting film, especially for the light it sheds on Meyer's attitude to his big-busted actresses" which mostly features "topless dancers in incongruous situations... The film's real interest is in its sound track, which consists of tape-recorded interviews with the dancers. They talk about the hazards and advantages of having large bosoms. There seems to be something subtly sadistic going on here; Meyer is simultaneously photographing the girls because of their dimensions, and recording them as they complain about their problems ('I have to have my bras custom-made'). This sets up a kind of psychological Mobius strip, and the encounter between the visuals and the words in Mondo Topless creates the kind of documentary tension Larry Rivers was going for in Tits."

Police raided a cinema in Cincinnati where the film was being screened.

References

External links 
 
 
Review of film at the Spinning Image
Mondo Topless at BFI

1966 films
Films directed by Russ Meyer
1960s English-language films
Mondo films
Films set in San Francisco